San Fernando, officially the Municipality of San Fernando,  is a 4th class municipality in the province of Romblon, Philippines. According to the 2020 census, it has a population of 24,171 people.

History

Early history
The town of San Fernando was established in 1636 as Visita de Cauit in what is today Barangay Azagra. It is one of two visitas in Sibuyan Island, the other being Cajidiocan. In 1744, Cajiodiocan was turned into a pueblo (town) which included Visita de Cauit.

The first villages or barrios of Visita de Cauit were Pag-alad, Cangumba, Mabolo or San Roque, Canjalon, España or Canago, Agtiwa, Cangumon and Otod. After Romblon was made a separate district in 1853, and the local government reorganization of 1855, 17 new pueblos were created including Visita de Cauit. On 3 February 1868, Pueblo de Cauit was renamed Pueblo de Azagra. One of Azagra's villages, Visita de Pag-alad was renamed Visita de San Fernando in 1882, in honor of Ferdinand Magellan.

Modern era

When civilian government was introduced to the province by the Americans on 16 March 1901, Azagra was one of 11 new municipalities created. However, by the end of the year, the seat of the municipality was transferred from Azagra to San Fernando village, thereby, changing the town's name.

On 8 June 1940, the passage of Commonwealth Act No. 581, sponsored by Congressman Leonardo Festin, created the special municipality of Sibuyan. It abolished San Fernando and was annexed to the new town whose seat of government was in Cajidiocan. The special municipality of Sibuyan was abolished by Republic Act No. 38, authored by Congressman Modesto Formilleza and enacted on 1 October 1946. It effectively restored San Fernando into its former status as an independent municipality.

In 1958, San Fernando High School, the town's highest institution of learning was converted into a national school for arts and trades known as Romblon National Vocation School under Republic Act No. 2428.

On 21 June 2008, MV Princess of the Stars, the flagship inter-island ferry of Sulpicio Lines sank in the waters of San Fernando after during the onslaught of Typhoon Fengshen (locally known as Typhoon Frank). Of the ship's 862 passengers and crew, only 48 survived while 67 were confirmed dead and 747 remain missing. A massive search-and-rescue, and then recovery and salvage operation, took place in the waters of San Fernando to remove remaining dead bodies and potentially dangerous cargo from the sunken ship. The wreck of the MV Princess of the Star still remains in the town's coastal waters.

Geography
San Fernando is a coastal town which lies on the south-western portion of the Sibuyan Island and is the biggest among the three towns comprising the island, the other two being Magdiwang and Cajidiocan. I The municipality has an irregular coastline broken by beautiful, long stretches of sandy beaches.

The municipality has high and steep mountain ranges as it is located at the foot of Romblon's tallest peak, Mount Guiting-Guiting. Other mountains are Mount Sibuyan and Mount Conico. Much of its territory is part of Mount Guiting-Guiting Natural Park made up of lush tropical rainforest where unique flora and fauna thrive, giving Sibuyan the nickname, "The Galapagos of the Philippines".

Climate

Barangays
San Fernando is politically subdivided into 12 barangays.

 Agtiwa
 Azagra
 Campalingo
 Canjalon
 España
 Mabini
 Mabulo
 Otod
 Panangcalan
 Pili
 Poblacion
 Taclobo

Demographics 

According to the 2015 census, San Fernando has a population of 23,271, which makes San Fernando the 3rd most inhabited town in the province of Romblon. The variant Romblomanon language locally called Sibuyanon dialect (Sibuyanon Magdiwang-España Style) is the native language in 4 eastern barangays of the municipality, while the rest speaks Sibuyanon (Sibujanon Azagra-San Fernando Style). The town has a Majority of Catholics and a few INC,Christian Bornagain and other Religions.

Economy

The municipality has various establishments including general merchandise stores, construction and welding shops, furniture outlets, funeral homes, rice mills, bakeshops, catering services, and one cable TV station. Fishing and Agriculture provides the main source of livelihood for the residents in San Fernando. The Sibuyan Sea and Cresta de Gallo serve as a fishing grounds due to its abundant marine animals like mackerel, sea quartz, tuna, dilis, tanguigue, lapu-lapu,  and tropical fish to name a few.The Agriculture sector of San Fernando is Mainly Rice and Corn Planting.

Infrastructure

Utilities
National Power Corporation operates a 650-kW plant and 1,025-kW substation in San Fernando.It also have a Mini Hydro Power Plant in Cantingas.ROMELCO, the local electric cooperative, also implements power supply on the households. For its water supply, the town uses the Cantingas irrigation system, which services some 384 hectares of farmland. Some households depend on individual potable distribution which comes from jet pumps and springs.

Transportation and communication
Tricycles are always available to carry passengers to town center or to the other places on the island when a ship is scheduled to arrive.There are also plans to open charter flights in Azagra Airstrip in the Town.There are also pumpboats that docks in the port of the town centre going to Roxas City.There are also pumpboats travel from agtiwa to Romblon Island.

From Azagra jeepneys and tricycles are always available to carry passengers to town center or to the other places on the island when a ship is scheduled to arrive.There are also plans to open charter flights in Azagra Airstrip in the Town.There are also pumpboats that docks in the port of the town centre going to Roxas City.There are also pumpboats travel from agatiwa to Romblon Island

PLDT offers telecommunication services in San Fernando. Cellular phone services from Smart and Globe are available as well. Terrestrial and cable television services have become available too. The Sibuyan Circumferential Road is the main thoroughfare that traverses the coastline of San Fernando. This road connects San Fernando with the other Sibuyan Island towns of Cajidiocan and Magdiwang. Means of transportation include jeepneys, light vehicles, truck, motorcycles, and tricycles. Globe and Smart cellular also has 3G internet connection in San Fernando.

Education
The San Fernando branch of Romblon State University offers a number of tertiary education courses for the local residents as well as students coming from all over the island. There are also 12 public elementary schools and two privately owned schools. There are also three government-owned secondary schools,one annex school and one privately owned school.

Tourism
Because of its untouched mountainous landscape, several rivers,springs,falls, and freshwater lakes can be found in San Fernando. These include:

Cresta de Gallo: A five-hectare kidney-shaped islet with verdant terrain sloping down to the powdery white sand beach and surrounded by beautiful corral reefs. The beach is rich with different species of marine life and an ideal place for swimming and scuba diving.
Busay Falls: A scenic spot with a natural pool located some 2.5 kilometers from Poblacion at Barangay Panangcalan. The upper portion is the water reservoir serving the Poblacion.
Cantingas River: The pride of Barangay Taclobo is a natural swimming pool with a crystal water. The river is odorless, tasteless, and ever-flowing cold where one could quench his thirst while swimming. It has a cottage with a conference hall.It was also awarded as cleaniest and greeniest river in the Philippines for the year 2003 and 2005.

Lamao Lake: A seven-hectare natural lake in Barangay Azagra.
Lagting Falls: This scenic hideaway with a basin-like natural pool is located in Barangay Taclobo, some 3 kilometers away from Poblacion. This falls is a refreshing place to immerse during this hot summer. It has two natural swimming pools with clean water and has several cottages available around the area
Dagubdob Falls: A falls in Sitio Olango in Barangay Espana that is near in the mountain.
Bila Bila Falls :A Beautiful Falls in Canjalon Named Bila Bila meaning Butterflies.

Government

Pursuant to Chapter II, Title II, Book III of Republic Act 7160 or the Local Government Code of 1991, the municipal government is composed of a mayor (alkalde), a vice mayor (bise alkalde) and members (kagawad) of the legislative branch Sangguniang Bayan alongside a secretary to the said legislature, all of which are elected to a three-year term and are eligible to run for three consecutive terms.

The incumbent mayor of San Fernando, Romblon, is Salem R. Tansingco and the incumbent vice mayor is Arben Rosas.

References

External links

 San Fernando, Romblon Profile - Cities and Municipalities Competitive Index
 [ Philippine Standard Geographic Code]
 Philippine Census Information
 Local Governance Performance Management System

Municipalities of Romblon